Strickland v. Washington, 466 U.S. 668 (1984), was a landmark Supreme Court case that established the standard for determining when a criminal defendant's Sixth Amendment right to counsel is violated by that counsel's inadequate performance.

The Court, in a decision by Justice O'Connor, established a two-part test for an ineffective assistance of counsel claim:
 Counsel's performance fell below an objective standard of reasonableness.
 Counsel's performance gives rise to a reasonable probability that if counsel had performed adequately, the result would have been different.

The decision was a compromise by the majority in which the varying "tests for ineffective performance of counsel" among the federal circuits and state supreme courts were forced into a singular middle ground test. State governments are free to create a test even more favorable to an appellant.

Background
David Washington pled guilty in a Florida trial court to an indictment that included three capital murder charges. During the plea colloquy, Washington told the trial judge that although he had committed a string of burglaries, at the time of his criminal spree, he was under extreme stress caused by his inability to support his family. The trial judge told Washington that he had "a great deal of respect for people who are willing to step forward and admit their responsibility."

In preparing for the sentencing hearing, defense counsel spoke with Washington about his background but did not seek out character witnesses or request a psychiatric examination. The counsel's decision not to present evidence concerning Washington's character and emotional state reflected his judgment that it was advisable to rely on the plea colloquy for evidence as to such matters, thus preventing the state from cross-examining Washington and from presenting psychiatric evidence of its own. Counsel did not request a presentence report because it would have included Washington's criminal history and thereby would have undermined the claim of no significant prior criminal record.

Finding numerous aggravating circumstances and no mitigating circumstance, the trial judge sentenced Washington to death on each of the murder counts. The Florida Supreme Court affirmed Washington's sentences on direct appeal.

Washington then sought collateral relief in state court on the ground, inter alia, that counsel had rendered ineffective assistance at the sentencing proceeding in several respects, including his failure to request a psychiatric report, to investigate and present character witnesses, and to seek a presentence report. The trial court denied relief, and the Florida Supreme Court affirmed.

Washington then filed a habeas corpus petition in Federal District Court advancing numerous grounds for relief, including the claim of ineffective assistance of counsel. After an evidentiary hearing, he was denied relief, as it was concluded that although counsel made errors in judgment in failing to investigate mitigating evidence further than he did, no prejudice to Washington's sentence resulted from any such error in judgment.

The United States Court of Appeals for the Fifth Circuit, in a three judge panel, determined that Washington had been ineffectively represented. However, the state of Florida appealed the decision, and the appeal occurred while the United States Court of Appeals for the Eleventh Circuit was statutorily created from a part of the Fifth Circuit.

The United States Court of Appeals for the Eleventh Circuit en banc, reversed the Fifth Circuit's ruling, stating that the Sixth Amendment accorded [466 U.S. 668, 669] criminal defendants a right to counsel rendering "reasonably effective assistance given the totality of the circumstances." After outlining standards for judging whether a defense counsel fulfilled the duty to investigate nonstatutory mitigating circumstances and whether counsel's errors were sufficiently prejudicial to justify reversal, it remanded the case for application of the standards.

The State of Florida appealed the decision to the United States Supreme Court, which granted certiorari.

Decision
The Supreme Court began its decision with the idea that the Sixth Amendment right to counsel "exists, and is needed, in order to protect the fundamental right to a fair trial." A fair trial is one in which "evidence subject to adversarial testing is presented to an impartial tribunal for resolution of issues defined in advance of the proceeding." Criminal defendants require counsel's skill and knowledge in order to be able to successfully rebuff the state's attempt to imprison or execute them. Accordingly, the Court has ruled that counsel must be appointed for criminal defendants if they cannot afford to hire their own counsel.

However, the fact that "a person who happens to be a lawyer is present at trial alongside the accused ... is not enough to satisfy the constitutional command." Counsel must play the role in the adversarial system that allows the system to produce just results. Hence, the right to counsel is the right to the effective assistance of counsel. A claim that counsel was ineffective, then, has two components, without which "it cannot be said that the conviction or death sentence resulted from a breakdown in the adversary process that renders the result unreliable:"
Firstly, the defendant must show that counsel's performance was "deficient," such that counsel's errors were "so serious that counsel was not functioning as the 'counsel' guaranteed the defendant by the Sixth Amendment."
Secondly, the deficient performance must be so serious as to deprive the defendant of a fair trial.

In order to show that counsel's performance was "deficient," the defendant must show that it fell below an "objective standard of reasonableness." The legal profession is capable of maintaining standards that justify the law's presumption that counsel ordinarily serves his function in the adversary system. That includes such basic duties as assisting the defendant and showing him undivided loyalty by representing him unburdened by any conflict of interest. Counsel should advocate the defendant's case, consult with the defendant on the important decisions and keep him informed of important developments in the course of the prosecution. However, the basic duties do not serve as a "checklist" for counsel for "no particular set of detailed rules for counsel's conduct can satisfactorily take account of the variety of circumstances faced by defense counsel or the range of legitimate decisions regarding how best to represent a criminal defendant." Counsel must have "wide latitude" to make "reasonable tactical decisions" lest the requirements for constitutionally effective assistance distract counsel from "the overriding mission of vigorous advocacy of the defendant's cause." Judges who evaluate ineffective assistance claims should, in turn, be highly deferential to counsel's decisions and avoid scrutinizing them in hindsight. Harsh scrutiny would encourage the proliferation of ineffective assistance claims and "dampen the ardor and impair the independence of defense counsel."

Counsel does, however, have a duty to make "reasonable investigations, or to make a reasonable decision that makes particular investigations unnecessary." After all, strategic decisions made in light of a reasonable investigation and compared to plausible options are virtually unchallengeable. By contrast, strategic choices made after less than complete investigation are reasonable only to the extent that reasonable professional judgments justify the curtailment of counsel's investigation. The judgments may be informed by statements the defendant himself makes to counsel and the effects of previous strategic choices.

However, not all errors on counsel's part justify setting aside the judgment; rather, they must prejudice the defendant's ability to receive a fair trial. In certain circumstances, such as when the defendant has had no counsel at all or when counsel has labored under a conflict of interest, the Court will presume prejudice, but ordinarily, the defendant must show that counsel's deficient performance had an adverse effect on the defense. Since the goal is to ensure that the defendant had a fair trial, the defendant must show that there is a reasonable probability that, but for counsel's errors, the result of the proceeding would have been different. The Court outlined several crucial guidelines to consider when applying the Strickland test: most importantly, the Court found that a "mechanical" application of the test was the wrong approach.

A reasonable probability is one sufficient to undermine confidence in the outcome. When the defendant challenges his conviction, he must show that counsel's errors prevented the jury from forming a reasonable doubt as to his guilt. When he challenges a death sentence, as Washington is doing, he must show a reasonable probability that the sentencer would have balanced the aggravation and mitigation evidence differently. The assessments must be made, of course, with respect to the totality of the evidence presented at the hearing so that when the prosecution's case is weak, the defendant will more easily show prejudice.

Applying the test to Washington's case, the Court concluded that counsel did not perform deficiently and that Washington suffered no prejudice. The counsel's decision to focus on remorse and emotional distress was a reasonable strategic decision in light of the trial judge's stated views on remorse, the heinousness of Washington's crimes, and Washington's own statements to counsel. In view of those considerations, the Court could not conclude that additional mitigating evidence would have given rise to a reasonable probability that the trial judge would have sentenced Washington to life in prison rather than death.

The majority reversed the judgment of the Court of Appeals.

Concurring opinion
Justice Brennan concurred in the result because he believed that the Court's new test for ineffective assistance, particularly the prejudice prong, would not impede the presentation of mitigating evidence on behalf of capital defendants:

Counsel's general duty to investigate ... takes on supreme importance to a defendant in the context of developing mitigating evidence to present to a judge or jury considering the sentence of death; claims of ineffective assistance in the performance of that duty should therefore be considered with commensurate care.

However, because Justice Brennan believed that the death penalty is in all circumstances cruel and unusual punishment, he would have vacated Washington's death sentence and remanded for further proceedings.

Dissenting opinion
Justice Marshall dissented from the majority's holding.

He objected that the Court's newly crafted test was unlikely to "improve the adjudication of Sixth Amendment claims." He considered the performance standard "so malleable that, in practice, it will either have no grip at all or will yield excessive variation in the manner in which the Sixth Amendment is interpreted and applied by different courts." What does "reasonable" mean? Should counsel's performance be judged by reference to a reasonable paid attorney or a reasonable appointed one? After all, Marshall pointed out, "a person of means, by selecting a lawyer and paying him enough to ensure he prepares thoroughly, usually can obtain better representation than that available to an indigent defendant, who must rely on appointed counsel, who, in turn, has limited time and resources to devote to a given case." Marshall also disputed that counsel's performance must be given especially wide latitude, since "much of the work involved in preparing for trial, applying for bail, conferring with one's client, making timely objections to significant, arguably erroneous rulings of the trial judge, and filing a notice of appeal if there are colorable grounds therefor could profitably be made the subject of uniform standards."

Marshall also disputed that it should be made the defendant's burden to show prejudice from an allegedly incompetent attorney's performance. Prejudice cannot be measured solely with respect to the fairness of the outcome of the trial; the fairness of the procedure matters just as much. "The majority contends that the Sixth Amendment is not violated when a manifestly guilty defendant is convicted after a trial in which he was represented by a manifestly ineffective attorney. I cannot agree."

Marshall worried that the Court's admonition to future judges, presented with ineffective assistance claims should defer to counsel's strategic judgments, placed too heavy a burden on defendants making such claims.

Finally, Marshall took issue with the Court's conclusion that the same standard for ineffectiveness should apply in a capital sentencing proceeding as applies at an ordinary trial. The capital sentencing process is intended to be especially reliable, and "reliability in the imposition of the death sentence can be approximated only if the sentencer is fully informed of all possible relevant information about the individual defendant whose fate it must determine." The defendant's attorney is responsible for doing that. That and in light of the "severity and irrevocability of the sanction at stake," the standard for effective assistance in capital sentencing proceedings must be especially stringent. Accordingly, Marshall believed that a person on death row seeking relief from his death sentence on grounds of ineffective assistance should not have to show a reasonable probability that he would not have received a death sentence if counsel had presented more mitigating evidence. Because it was clear that Washington's attorney had failed to investigate and then present large amounts of information to the sentencing judge, Marshall concluded that Washington's lawyer was ineffective.

Subsequent events
Washington was executed on July 13, 1984, two months after the Supreme Court's decision.

One of the important aspects of this decision was its relationship to United States v. Cronic, 466 U.S. 648 (1984), and the number of appeals "held" by the Court in abeyance for the decision.  Justice O'Connor's ability to gain a majority in this decision prevented the antiquated "farce and mockery standard," a standard extremely difficult to achieve for an appellant, from making a return. (See Kastenberg article listed below.)

See also
List of United States Supreme Court cases, volume 466
Wiggins v. Smith (2003)
Premo v. Moore (2011)

Notes

References

Further reading

Casey Scott McKay, Constitutional Law-the Plea-Bargaining Process-Mr. Counsel, Please Bargain Effectively for Your Client's Sixth Amendment Rights, Otherwise the Trial Court Will Be Forced to Reoffer the Plea Deal and Then Exercise Discretion in Resentencing, 82 Miss. L.J. 731 (2013),  available at Mississippi Law Journal : Volume 82, Number 3
Kastenberg, Joshua E, "Nearing Thirty Years:  The Burger Court, Strickland v. Washington, and the Parameters of the Right to Counsel," Journal of Appellate Practice and Process, 14 J. App. Prac. & Proc 215 (2013).

External links
 

United States Supreme Court cases
United States Supreme Court cases of the Burger Court
United States Sixth Amendment ineffective assistance of counsel case law
1984 in United States case law